Lake Abanakee is located northeast of Indian Lake, New York. Fish species present in the lake are northern pike, white sucker, smallmouth bass, largemouth bass, black bullhead, yellow perch, rock bass, and sunfish. There is a canoe launch on the west shore off Big Brook Road and a second canoe launch on the south shore, off Jerry Savarie Road.

References

Lakes of New York (state)
Lakes of Hamilton County, New York